Elf Bowling is a bowling video game developed by NStorm and released in 1998. In the game 
the player, as Santa Claus, attempts to knock down elves who are arranged like bowling pins. A later release of the game, by Ignition Entertainment, was released on the Nintendo handheld consoles Nintendo DS and Game Boy Advance, and received overwhelmingly negative reviews from critics. In Elf Bowling, the elves of Santa's Workshop are on strike due to overwork from the huge demand for Christmas toys, so Santa Claus has decided to whip them into shape by using them as bowling pins.

During the game, the elves say phrases such as "Is that all the balls you got, Santa?" when the player misses their first spare opportunity or "Gutter ball!" in a silly-sounding voice when a ball is rolled into the gutter. Other potential distractions for the user are a Reindeer that walks up along the bowling lane that can be "hit" with the bowling ball if the arrow is positioned to the far left, and a frog wearing a Santa hat hopping back and forth across the player's field of vision (resembling Kalvin Kroaker from Frogapult, also made by NStorm). If the player hits the frog with the bowling ball, his body is hauled away from the screen by a bird from Frogapult. A white rabbit also jumps and defecates across the bowling lane. The elves moon Santa (asking "who's your daddy" as they do it). Both during the game and after a game finishes, the elves do a dance, shouting "Elf elf, baby!" in reference to Vanilla Ice's song "Ice Ice Baby". The elves can also randomly move out of the way of the ball, and one elf can be decapitated by the pinsetter.

History 
The game was originally created as promotional marketing content by Dan Ferguson and Mike Bielinski, both co-founders of the game studio NVision Design. The game became an internet sensation in 1999 when people originally thought it was a computer virus. The game was an EXE file and was easily distributed as an attachment to emails. (In 1999, EXE files could be attached to emails as there was no protective software to remove an EXE at the time.) Direct Marketing News did an article on the original developers - Direct Marketing News Article. According to Media Metrix, among the 54 million people playing PC games in the month of December 2000, Elf Bowling was the game to hit the top 10 with 7.6 million players that was not bundled with Windows. Local Fox News Affiliate KDFW Dallas Fort Worth did an interview with Dan Ferguson and Mike Bileinski after they sold their company to Vectrix Business Solutions. Vectrix Business Solutions acquired Nvision 1999 and subsequently filed for Chapter 11 bankruptcy. Elf Bowling and Frogapult were sold by Vectrix Business Solutions with the approval of the Bankruptcy Court on October 31, 2001, to Commotion Interactive, Inc. (Elf Bowling 3 was recently released by the Dallas firm NStorm, a subsidiary of Commotion Interactive). Matthew Lichtenwalter, CEO of NStorm and Commotion Interactive, has created the series since.

Sequel
In the sequel to Elf Bowling, the elves return, as they attempt to go on an island vacation with old Kringle. 
Dingle Kringle (a failure as a used ice salesman) is Santa's elder brother, whom Mrs. Claus takes a shine to. The brothers make a double-or-nothing wager in a game of shuffleboard, of which on random occasions, a Moai can fall on an elf. The winner gets the title of "Father Christmas" while the loser loses his job. The elves are used as pucks.

Gameplay and scoring
The player grabs the thong bathing suit that the elf is wearing, then snaps it to propel the elf forward. There are 100, 200, and 300 point scoring zones and a player can score 400 points if their elf slides all the way to the edge of the board without falling into the ocean;  elves falling into the ocean get eaten by sharks or crushed by a falling Moai. There is also the possibility of an elf not advancing far enough to score, which happens if a player does not get enough power behind the snap. Only elves that are on the board after Santa and Dingle have taken their turns count towards the score, and it is possible for an elf to be knocked off the board by another elf (although it is also possible for the elves to be moved into higher scoring zones after contact). One elf per round is worth bonus points, indicated by a flashing bathing suit. In the first and second rounds, the bonus elf is worth double the throw, and in the third, he is worth triple the throw (meaning that the maximum number of points in these rounds that can be earned on one turn is 800 or 1200). The elf only appears once per round and appears randomly.

Bonus points can be gained by shooting the penguins and their balloons on an iceberg located to the right of the ship. The iceberg can also be shot, but doing so (in the right spot) will sink it and take it out of play.

Other Elf Bowling games

To date, there have been eight editions of the game for PC computers.

 Elf Bowling 3 involved slinging elves in Mrs. Kringle's pink bra onto distant ice-bound targets.
 Super Elf Bowling (Elf Bowling 4) was a 3-dimensional upgrade of the original with more complicated ball control and a wider variety of backgrounds, elf antics and elf jokes. One could also play as a variety of characters, including Santa, Dingle, and Mrs. Kringle.
 Elf Bowling - Bocce Style (Elf Bowling 5) used the elves as bocce balls.
 Elf Bowling 6: Air Biscuits involved bowling the elf over a mound of snow which sends the elf airborne. The elf could remain in the air by using "fart" power.
 Elf Bowling 7: The Last Insult returns the game to its original bowling but with new wrinkles. A story mode is added, and the Elves can and will do anything to stop Santa from rolling a strike. Santa, however, has power-ups that can foil them.
 Elf Bowling Hawaiian Vacation -  Elf Bowling in exotic places.

Elf Bowling 1 & 2
The first two Elf Bowling games were released by Ignition Entertainment under the title Elf Bowling 1 & 2 for the Nintendo DS and Game Boy Advance. The pack was panned by critics and is considered one of the worst video games of all time, citing poor graphics, crude audio and controls, and no extras beyond the original freeware version. It ranks as one of the lowest scoring games at both GameSpot and Metacritic, receiving only 1.4 out of 10 at GameSpot and 12 out of 100 at Metacritic.

Film adaptation

A computer-animated film produced by based on the games was released on October 3, 2007, and was entitled Elf Bowling the Movie: The Great North Pole Elf Strike. It features the voices of the late Joe Alaskey, Rex Piano, Jill Talley, and Tom Kenny.  

The film was a United States-Fiji-South Korea co-production directed by Dave Kim with Rex Piano as co-director. The musical score for the film was composed by Chris Anderson. Simi Valley, California resident David Kim was asked to direct the film while studying editing at the Academy of Art University; Kim took the offer as a way to break into the film industry, previously working as a production assistant on music videos. After finishing Elf Bowling, he got work as a production coordinator on The Simpsons Movie (2007) and The Golden Compass (2007). Produced by Filmbrokers International, Elf Bowling the Movie began production in Fiji and South Korea before moving into a Simi Valley house owned by Kim's mother, where the film's story reel was edited. Dance movements for the musical sequences were animated with motion capture, Kim himself wearing one of the Mo-cap suits. Screen Media Films, a company of Universal Studios Home Entertainment, distributed Elf Bowling the Movie. 

The film was released on DVD on October 2, 2007 before being released on Amazon Prime on January 1, 2008 and Blu-ray on May 18, 2016. 

The film was panned by critics for its writing, animation, directing, humor, plot, musical numbers, voice acting, characterizations, and for having little to nothing to do with the premise of the game. Due to the film's disastrous critical reception, plans for a sequel titled Elf Bowling 2: The Great Halloween Pumpkin-Heist were immediately cancelled. 

The film received a parody stage adaptation in 2021 by Chapman University's sketch comedy group The Player's Society, adapted by Sasha Espinosa and directed by Delaney Tobin.

References

External links
 CNET Article on Original Creators
 
 

1998 video games
Flash games ported to consoles
Game Boy Advance games
Mobile games
Nintendo DS games
Video games developed in the United States
Windows games
Bowling video games
Christmas video games
Works about vacationing
2000s English-language films
UTV Ignition Games games